aka Tora-san in Love is a 1971 Japanese comedy film directed by Yoji Yamada. It stars Kiyoshi Atsumi as Torajirō Kuruma (Tora-san), and Ayako Wakao as his love interest or "Madonna". Tora-san's Shattered Romance is the sixth entry in the popular, long-running Otoko wa Tsurai yo series.

Synopsis
A girl who has escaped from an institution falls in love with Tora-san. He decides to marry her, but his family and the girl's teacher break up the romance.

Cast
 Kiyoshi Atsumi as Torajiro
 Chieko Baisho as Sakura
 Ayako Wakao as Yūko Akashi
 Shin Morikawa as Kuruma Tatsuzō
 Chieko Misaki as Tsune Kuruma (Torajiro's aunt)
 Gin Maeda as Hiroshi Suwa
 Chishū Ryū as Gozen-sama
 Hisao Dazai as Tarō Ume
 Gajirō Satō as Genkō
 Hisaya Morishige as Senzō
 Nobuko Miyamoto as Kinuyo
 Tatsuo Matsumura as Doctor Yamashita
 Gorō Tarumi as Yūko's husband

Critical appraisal

For his work on Tora-san's Shattered Romance as well as the next two entries in the Otoko wa Tsurai yo series, Tora-san, the Good Samaritan and Tora-san's Love Call (all 1971), Yoji Yamada tied for Best Director at the Mainichi Film Awards with Masahiro Shinoda. The German-language site molodezhnaja gives Tora-san's Shattered Romance three and a half out of five stars.

Availability
Tora-san's Shattered Romance was released theatrically on January 15, 1971. In Japan, the film was released on videotape in 1983 and 1995, and in DVD format in 2005 and 2008.

References

Bibliography

English

German

Japanese

External links
 Tora-san's Shattered Romance at www.tora-san.jp (official site)

1971 films
Films directed by Yoji Yamada
1970s Japanese-language films
Otoko wa Tsurai yo films
Japanese sequel films
Shochiku films
Films with screenplays by Yôji Yamada
1971 comedy films
1970s Japanese films